The PNR 5000 class are Diesel-electric locomotives of the Philippine National Railways acquired in 1992.

Operational history
The 5000 class locomotives were acquired in 1992 to haul dead-motor CMC diesel multiple units. These were eventually used to haul passenger coaches in the PNR Metro Commuter Line. Currently, two locomotives are active, 5009 are assigned in the Bicol Commuter Line while 5007 is in Manila

Two locomotives, DEL 5001 (still under rehabilitation) and DEL 5007 is repainted into an orange livery, to follow suit with some 900 class and 2500 class locomotives being repainted in the orange livery.

Specifications
It is powered by an 8-cylinder Caterpillar D379 engine, with an equipped GE GT751 main generator and GE GY27 auxiliary generator.

Build numbers
The following are the serial numbers of the 5000 class.

Status
As of November 2022, 3 units are active, 1 unit is inactive, and 6 are beyond economical repair.

Gallery

Notes

References

Philippine National Railways
Rolling stock of the Philippines
3 ft 6 in gauge locomotives
Railway locomotives introduced in 1992